Gwardia Wrocław can refer to:

Gwardia Wrocław (men's volleyball)
Gwardia Wrocław (women's volleyball)
Gwardia Wrocław (sports club) (pl)
Gwardia Wrocław (basketball) (pl)
Gwardia Wrocław (football) (pl)